Cumbernauld and Kilsyth may refer to:

 Cumbernauld and Kilsyth (district)
 Cumbernauld and Kilsyth (UK Parliament constituency)
 Cumbernauld and Kilsyth (Scottish Parliament constituency)